The 2018 Healthy Ageing Tour was a women's cycle stage race that was held in the Netherlands from 4 to 8 April 2018. The 2018 edition of the race was the eighth running of the Healthy Ageing Tour, being held with a UCI rating of 2.1.

The race was marked by the performance of the entire  team; aside from winning the team time trial stage, their riders Anna van der Breggen, Amy Pieters and Chantal Blaak won three others. In the overall classification, Pieters won by 22 seconds ahead of Blaak, while Christine Majerus completed the podium – just ahead of van der Breggen, in a  1–2–3–4 – a further 20 seconds in arrears. The other major jerseys were won by Kirsten Wild (points for ), Natalie van Gogh (sprints for ) and Lisa Klein (young rider for ).

Teams
A total of 20 teams competed in the race, including 9 UCI Women's Teams.

Route

Stages

Stage 1
4 April 2018 — Heerenveen to Heerenveen, individual time trial (ITT)

Stage 2
5 April 2018 — Westerkwartier to Grootegast,

Stage 3a
6 April 2018 — Oldambt to Winschoten,

Stage 3b
6 April 2018 — Stadskanaal to Stadskanaal, team time trial (TTT)

Stage 4
7 April 2018 — Hogeland to Winsum,

Stage 5
8 April 2018 — Groningen to Groningen,

Classification leadership table
In the 2018 Healthy Ageing Tour, six different jerseys were awarded. For the general classification, calculated by adding each cyclist's finishing times on each stage, and allowing time bonuses for the first three finishers at intermediate sprints and at the finish of mass-start stages, the leader received a yellow jersey. This classification was considered the most important of the 2018 Healthy Ageing Tour, and the winner of the classification was considered the winner of the race.

Additionally, there was a points classification, which awarded a green jersey. In the points classification, cyclists received points for finishing in the top 15 in a stage. For winning a stage, a rider earned 25 points, with 20 for second, 16 for third, 14 for fourth, 12 for fifth, 10 for sixth with a point fewer per place down to a single point for 15th place. The third classification was the sprints classification, the leader of which was awarded an orange jersey. In the sprints classification, riders received points for finishing in the top three at intermediate sprint points during each stage.

The fourth jersey represented the young rider classification, marked by a white jersey. This was decided in the same way as the general classification, but only riders born after 1 January 1996 were eligible to be ranked in the classification. Other jerseys were awarded to the best club rider amongst the amateur riders (blue), and for the most courageous rider showing fighting spirit (red). There was also a classification for teams, in which the times of the best three cyclists per team on each stage were added together; the leading team at the end of the race was the team with the lowest total time.

See also
2018 in women's road cycling

Notes

References

Sources

External links

2018 in women's road cycling
2018 in Dutch sport
2018